Fox Hunting  is a 1980 crime drama directed by Vadim Abdrashitov.

Plot 
Two youngsters beat a worker and are justly punished: one receives a suspended sentence, and the other goes to serve in the colony. But the victim is haunted by thoughts regarding the fate of these teenagers. He begins to regularly meet with the prisoners in the hope of getting to reach their hearts.

The protagonist of this drama is an enthusiast of the nowadays rare type of Radiosport of the same name, fox hunting.

Cast
Vladimir Gostyukhin as Viktor Belov
Irina Muravyova as Marina Belova
 Igor Nefyodov as Vladimir Belikov
  Dmitry Kharatyan as Kostya Stryzhak
 Alla Pokrovskaya as Olga Sergeyevna, Stryzhak's mother
 Andrey Turkov as Valerik, Belov's son  
 Mikhail Bocharov as Viktor Semenovich, chairman of the factory committee
 Margarita Zharova as Judge
 Antonina Konchakova as Belikov's mother
 Nikolay Smorchkov as policeman

Awards
 San Remo Film Festival   —  Best Director  (Vadim Abdrashitov), Best Actor (Vladimir Gostyukhin)

References

External links

1980 films
Films directed by Vadim Abdrashitov
Soviet crime drama films
Mosfilm films
1980 crime drama films
Films scored by Eduard Artemyev